Angrezi Mein Kehte Hain is an Indian edutainment show on NDTV Imagine that premiered on 24 March 2008. It was produced by BIG Synergy.

Synopsis
Angrezi Mein Kehte Hain is an edutainment show that teaches the English language in an entertaining way. The show features a teacher who motivates a collection of students to use the language correctly. Every episode starts with a new lesson which is followed by the use of the topics taught.

Cast 
Shernaz Patel as English Teacher
Anoop Kamal Singh as Duggal uncle
Jaya Ojha - Rukshanaji
Snigdha Pandey as Deepti Pandya 
Shiju Kataria as Chaaya Arora
Sanjay Mishra (actor) as Various characters

References

External links
Official Site

2008 Indian television series debuts
Imagine TV original programming
2009 Indian television series endings
Educational television series
Television series about educators